Founded in 1923 the Brownsburg Fire Territory (BFT) is a Fire Territory located in the central Indiana town of Brownsburg.  The original volunteer fire department, formed in 1942, served the town of Brownsburg and not rural communities. In 1945 the volunteer department began providing limited services to rural communities.  In 1995 the department, along with state legislators, formed Indiana's first Fire Protection Territory.  The newly formed territory now provided full fire protection for Brown and Lincoln Townships.  With complete coverage, rural residents received shorter response times because of newly built stations in the townships.

History
Timeline of the history of the Brownsburg Fire Territory
 1923 Voulunteer Fire Department in Brownsburg formed
 1942 The Brownsburg Volunteer Fire Department (BVFD) is formed and elects officers.
 1945 On May 6 Brownsburg passes an ordinance to provide fire protection service to Brown and Lincoln townships.
 1946 First official fire station built.
 1959 BVFD becomes Brownsburg Fire Department (BFD); first rescue squad put into service on November 10
 1965 First ambulance bought on September 25
 1974 First EMT class formed
 1976 The 911 system went on-line in September
 1979 BFD's first full-time chief starts on January 1
 1988 First full-time firefighters hired
 1991 BFD switched to 24-hour shifts with 3 firefighters with one also being a paramedic on each shift
 1995 BFD becomes Brownsburg Fire Territory (BFT); Station 132 built in Brown Township
 2004 BFT Headquarters and Training Facility opens in April
 2007 Station 133 opens in March
 2019 The Brownsburg Fire Territory achieved an ISO 1 rating, becoming only the 3rd department in the State of Indiana to receive this rating.

Equipment
As of 2010 BFT has
 4 fire engines
 1 Ladder truck
 1 heavy rescue truck
 1 grass fire truck
 4 ambulances
 1 Battalion chief vehicle
 note that 1 fire engine and ambulance are reserves, but are used frequently

References
https://web.archive.org/web/20120326094518/http://www.brownsburgfire.org/history.aspx

https://web.archive.org/web/20110927050308/http://www.brownsburgfire.org/about_us.aspx

External links
 Brownsburg Fire Territory

Hendricks County, Indiana